Varvara Gracheva was the defending champion but chose not to participate.

Lucia Bronzetti won the title, defeating Simona Waltert in the final, 2–6, 6–3, 6–3.

Seeds

Draw

Finals

Top half

Bottom half

References

Main Draw

Axion Open - Singles